Camilla Larsen Degn (born 19 December 1997) is a Danish handball player who currently plays for Randers HK.

References

1997 births
Living people
People from Randers
Danish female handball players
Sportspeople from the Central Denmark Region